Sam Crane may refer to:

Sam Crane (second baseman) (1854–1925), American baseball player and sportswriter
Sam Crane (shortstop) (1894–1955), American baseball player
Sam Crane (actor), British actor
Samuel Crane, Canadian businessman and political figure